The Naked Edge is a 1961 thriller film starring Gary Cooper (in his final film role) and Deborah Kerr. The film was a British-American co-production distributed by United Artists, directed by Michael Anderson and produced by George Glass and Walter Seltzer, with Marlon Brando Sr. as executive producer. The screenplay was written by Joseph Stefano and Max Ehrlich, the musical score was created by William Alwyn, the cinematography was handled by Erwin Hillier and Tony White and the production designer was Carmen Dillon.

The film was shot in London and at Elstree Studios, Borehamwood, Hertfordshire.

Plot 
In the aftermath of a theft and murder, Martha Radcliffe increasingly suspects her husband George Radcliffe, whose testimony in court convicted the main suspect, of being the real culprit.

Businessman Jason Root is stabbed to death on a night when George and a clerk named Donald Heath are the only other employees working at the office. A mailbag full of money is stolen in the process. George sees Heath in the boiler room when he runs after the murderer right after he hears Root crying after being stabbed; George, who is seen sweating nervously both during the trial and later, insists that Heath must have been the murderer, and Heath is convicted. Several years later, a lost mailbag is found and the Radcliffes receive a long-delayed letter that was in the bag. The letter, which Martha reads, contains a blackmail threat from Jeremy Clay accusing George of the crime.

As the story unfolds, clues pointing to George quickly accumulate. These include a new business he started soon after the trial, using money that he claims to have made in the stock market; his own desperate desire for success; lying to his wife in order to secretly search for Clay; the suspicious new business with an unknown man, Morris Brooke, right after the trial; and Clay's claim, when Martha finds him, that he was an eyewitness to the crime and George was the murderer.

George and Martha repeatedly have conversations in which she vacillates between questioning him and insisting she believes in his innocence, and he alternates between insisting that she believe in him and telling her to make up her own mind. Tension is built by the repeated appearance of George's old-style shaving razor, his insistence that Martha join him at the edge of a cliff, references to his masculine virility and his warning that Martha's investigation could threaten his business.

At the conclusion, Clay tries to kill Martha after being seen sharpening George's razor. George rescues his wife just in time and subdues Clay as the police arrive.

Cast 
 Gary Cooper as George Radcliffe 
 Deborah Kerr as Martha Radcliffe 
 Eric Portman as Jeremy Clay 
 Ray McAnally as Donald Heath 
 Diane Cilento as Mrs. Heath 
 Hermione Gingold as Lilly Harris 
 Peter Cushing as Mr. Evan Wrack 
 Michael Wilding as Morris Brooke 
 Ronald Howard as Mr. Claridge 
 Sandor Elès as Manfridi St John 
 Wilfrid Lawson as Mr. Pom 
 Helen Cherry as Miss Osborne 
 Joyce Carey as Victoria Hicks
 Diane Clare as Betty
 Frederick Leister as Judge
 Martin Boddey as Jason Roote
 Peter Wayn as Chauffeur

Reception

Critic reception
In the New York Times, Bosley Crowther dismissed the film as "manufactured tension of the plainest sort, worked up with illogical twists and tricks of photography and cutting by which director Michael Anderson has apparently hoped to heighten the melodramatic mood. It also has a good cast, in addition to Mr. Cooper and Miss Kerr — Eric Portman, Michael Wilding, Hermione Gingold, Diane Cilento and even Wilfred Lawson and Joyce Carey in bit roles. But it is pure claptrap entertainment—a piece of cheese, as we say, full of holes. And it is sad to see poor old Coop in it. Well, we can remember him for many better things." Variety noted, "the picture that winds up Gary Cooper’s long list of credits is a neatly constructed, thoroughly professional little suspense meller."

Box office
The film was estimated to have earned theatrical rentals worldwide of $6 million, generating $400,000 for Cooper's estate.

References

External links
 
 

1961 films
American crime thriller films
British crime thriller films
Films shot at Associated British Studios
American black-and-white films
United Artists films
Films directed by Michael Anderson
Films with screenplays by Joseph Stefano
Films set in London
Films scored by William Alwyn
1960s English-language films
1960s American films
1960s British films